Doug Graham (born 1942) is a former New Zealand politician. 

Doug or Douglas Graham may also refer to:

 Douglas Graham (British Army officer) (1893–1971), British Army general
 Douglas Graham, 5th Duke of Montrose (1852–1925), Scottish nobleman
 Doug Graham (Canadian politician), Canadian politician in the Yukon Legislative Assembly
 Doug Graham (Winners & Losers), fictional character from Australian drama series Winners & Losers
 Doug Graham (sailor) (born 1959), United States Virgin Islands sailor